MacTaggart is a surname of Scottish or Ultonian origin. It is an  Anglicisation of the Scottish Gaelic Mac an t-Sagairt, meaning "son of the priest" Also having the forms McTaggart and Taggart.

People with the surname MacTaggart

Fearchar mac an t-sagairt (anglicised as  Farquhar MacTaggart) 13th century Earl of Ross
Fiona Mactaggart
Gerry MacTaggart
Ivan Mactaggart
James MacTaggart
John Mactaggart (disambiguation)
Sandy Mactaggart
William MacTaggart

Other
Mactaggart baronets
MacTaggart-Stewart baronets
Mark MacTaggart-Stewart
Mactaggart, Edmonton, Alberta, Canada
Mactaggarts Woolstore, Brisbane, Australia

See also
 Moira MacTaggert, comic book character
 McTaggart
 Taggart (surname)

References